James William Flanery II (born February 8, 1965) is the head women's basketball coach at Creighton University.

Career
In his first five years coaching at Creighton, the team made the WNIT three times, and the NCAA Tournament in 2012. In 2004, Creighton won the 2004 WNIT Championship. In his first season, he won 24 games, the most ever by a Creighton rookie head coach. Flanery previously served as an assistant at Creighton for 11 years. He also served as an assistant basketball coach at Loras College.

Head coaching record

References

External links
 Jim Flanery bio

1965 births
Living people
American women's basketball coaches
Basketball coaches from Iowa
Basketball players from Iowa
Creighton Bluejays men's basketball players
Creighton Bluejays women's basketball coaches
People from Guthrie Center, Iowa
American men's basketball players